is a railway station in Ōita City, Ōita Prefecture, Japan. It is operated by JR Kyushu and is on the Kyudai Main Line.

Lines

Layout 
The station consists of two side platforms serving two tracks. The station building is a modern steel structure and houses a waiting area and a staffed ticket window. Part of the building is occupied by a newsagent. Access to the opposite side platform is by means of a level crossing.

Management of the station has been outsourced to the JR Kyushu Tetsudou Eigyou Co., a wholly owned subsidiary of JR Kyushu specialising in station services. It staffs the ticket counter which is equipped with a POS machine but does not have a Midori no Madoguchi facility.

Adjacent stations

History
On 1 December 1922, the Daito Railway was nationalized and absorbed into Japanese Government Railways, (JGR) which designated the track which served the station as part of the Daito Line. On 1 December 1925, the station was remained Minami-Ōita. On 15 November 1934, when the Daito Line had linked up with the Kyudai Main Line further west, JGR designated the station as part of the Kyudai Main Line. With the privatization of Japanese National Railways (JNR), the successor of JGR, on 1 April 1987, the station came under the control of JR Kyushu.

Passenger statistics
In fiscal 2016, the station was used by an average of 556 passengers daily (boarding passengers only), and it ranked 231st among the busiest stations of JR Kyushu.

See also
List of railway stations in Japan

References

External links
Minami-Ōita (JR Kyushu)

Railway stations in Ōita Prefecture
Railway stations in Japan opened in 1915
Ōita (city)